The Victorian Premier's Prize for Nonfiction, formerly known as the 
Nettie Palmer Prize for Non-Fiction, is a prize category in the annual Victorian Premier's Literary Award. As of 2011 it has a remuneration of 25,000. The winner of this category prize vies with 4 other category winners for overall Victorian Prize for Literature valued at an additional 100,000.

The prize was formerly known as the Nettie Palmer Prize for Non-Fiction from inception until 2010 when the awards were re-established under the stewardship of the Wheeler Centre and restarted with new prize amounts and a new name. The Nettie Palmer Prize was valued at 30,000 in 2010. According to the State Library of Victoria which managed the prize from 1997 to 2010, "This prize is offered for a published work of non-fiction. Books consisting principally of photographs or illustrations are ineligible unless the accompanying text is of substantial length." Palmer wrote regularly for numerous newspapers all round Australia.  She wrote on a wide range of topics, from environment to cultural events, reviewing all important books being published in Australia, America, Europe and elsewhere.

Victorian Premier's Prize for Nonfiction
Winners of the Overall Victorian Prize for Literature have a blue ribbon.

Nettie Palmer Prize for Nonfiction

Notes

References 

Victorian Premier's Literary Awards
Australian non-fiction book awards
Awards established in 1989